Future Rock (or FR) is an electronic rock trio hailing from Chicago, Illinois.  The band consists of Felix Moreno on bass guitar and synthesizer, Mickey Kellerman on keyboards and synthesizers, and Darren Heitz on drums. Future Rock mixes standard live rock instrumentation with electronics. The type of music is classified as electronica, but fuses elements of progressive house and dance-rock. Their music is often intense and quirky, yet very danceable.

Future Rock has released five albums and toured the US nationally with a heavy presence in the music festival circuit.

History
Future Rock formed in early 2004 (Kellerman and Moreno had formerly been members of the Evanston-based experimental rock group Co-Dependant Origination).  Future Rock's debut album, Sugar Coated Bullets, was self-released on May 9, 2006. In March 2007, Future Rock signed to Harmonized Records and released the album Gears. In May 2010, Future Rock released Live In Wicker Park, a recording from a live performance on Harmonized Records. In April 2011, Future Rock self-released the album Nights in April 2011, and in early 2012 signed with 1320 Records, a label run by Sound Tribe Sector 9. 1320 Records re-released Nights with some additional remixes, and in July 2012, Future Rock released One Day on 1320 Records.

Future Rock enjoyed a breakout year in 2006, performing at many of the largest music festivals in the US, including High Sierra and Wakarusa.  In August 2006, the band performed two sets at Camp Bisco V, including one set of original music and a late-night set where they performed as Aphex Rock, playing the music of Aphex Twin.

Discography
Sugar Coated Bullets - 2006
Gears - 2007
Live In Wicker Park - 2010
Nights - 2011
One Day - 2012
Daft Rock Live - 2016
Long Ago - 2016

References
August 2006 Relix magazine Page 86
Jambase (published July 27, 2006) Jambase Review
The Phoenix (published July 27, 2006) Future Rock show preview
Glide Magazine (published July 10, 2006) Glide Magazine Review

External links
Future Rock official website
Future Rock Live Music Archive download page
Future Rock Myspace page

Electronic music groups from Illinois
Musical groups from Chicago
Livetronica music groups